Horseshoe Indianapolis (formerly Indiana Grand Racing & Casino and Indiana Live!) is a casino with a horse racing track in Shelbyville, Indiana owned and operated by Caesars Entertainment. It is the closest casino to Indianapolis. It offers gaming, restaurants, a gift shop and entertainment. The  facility has over 1,704 slot machines and live table games. It was built at a cost of more than $250 million.

Horseshoe Indianapolis' casino has hosted musicians such as The Buckinghams, Grand Funk Railroad, Duke Tumatoe of REO Speedwagon, Peter Noone of Herman's Hermits, The Lovin' Spoonful, The Box Tops, Paul Revere & the Raiders, The Fabulous Thunderbirds, The Kentucky Headhunters, Fuel, 
Marc Cohn, All-4-One, Color Me Badd, Ginuwine, Ludacris, and comedian Mike Epps.

The racetrack was previously known as Indiana Downs. The casino opened on March 13, 2009 as Indiana Live! Casino. It was renamed Indiana Grand Casino in June 2012, and rebranded as Indiana Grand Racing & Casino in February 2013. Centaur Gaming purchased the casino in February 2013. Caesars Entertainment acquired it in 2018. The Indiana Grand racetrack and casino complex were rebranded to Horseshoe Indianapolis in late January 2022, in line with other properties owned by Caesars.

Horseshoe Indianapolis offers live Thoroughbred and Quarter Horse racing from April through October. The track is affiliated with three OTB parlors around Indiana, in Clarksville, Indianapolis, and New Haven.

Horseshoe Indianapolis is the home of the Indiana Derby.

Races

Graded events

Grade III

Indiana Derby
Indiana Oaks

Stakes events
Thoroughbred stakes races include:
 Sagamore Sired Stakes
 ITOBA Stallion Season Fillies Stakes
 Hoosier Breeders Sophomore
 Hoosier Breeders Sophomore Fillies
 Mari Hulman George Stakes
 Michael G Schaefer Memorial Mile
 Indiana General Assembly Distaff
 Warrior Veterans
 Governor's
 Indiana First Lady
 William Henry Harrison Stakes
 Shelby County Stakes
 Centaur
 Indiana Grand
 A. J. Foyt Stakes
 Florence Henderson Stakes
 Crown Ambassador
 Indiana Stallion Fillies
 Indiana Futurity
 Miss Indiana

Quarter Horse stakes races include:
 Born Runner Classic 
 Harley Greene Derby Final 
 Gordon Mobley Futurity Final 
 Jaguar Rocket QH Stakes Final 
 Blue River Derby Stakes Final 
 Bob Woodward Memorial Classic Final 
 QHRAI Stallion Service Auction Futurity Final 
 Sterlie Bertram Memorial Stakes Final 
 Miss Roxie Little Final 
 Indiana Championship 
 Governors Stake Final 
 QHRAI Derby Final

See also 
List of casinos in Indiana

References

External links 

Casinos in Indiana
Casinos completed in 2009
Tourist attractions in Shelby County, Indiana
Buildings and structures in Shelby County, Indiana
Horse racing in Indiana
Caesars Entertainment
2009 establishments in Indiana